Zaratha pterodactylella is a moth of the family Agonoxenidae. It is found in Central America.

References

Moths described in 1864
Zaratha
Moths of Central America